Slieve True or Slievetrue is a  hill in County Antrim, Northern Ireland.

These have since been integrated into a field wall. There is also a cairn in the area.

In May 2013, Irish electricity company Gaelectric opened a wind farm in the Carn Hill area of Slievetrue, consisting of six wind turbines at a total cost of £20 million.

References

Mountains and hills of County Antrim